The year 1971 in architecture involved some significant architectural events and new buildings.

Events
 July 19 – The South Tower of the World Trade Center, by Minoru Yamasaki, is topped out at 1,362 feet (415 m), making it the second tallest building in the world.

Buildings and structures

Buildings opened

January 9 – Courts of Justice building in Valletta, Malta 
February 26 – Rothko Chapel in Houston, Texas, United States, designed by Mark Rothko and Philip Johnson.
May 1 – Näsinneula tower in Tampere, Finland.
May 9 – Peace Candle of the World, Scappoose, Oregon, USA.
 August – Meritus Mandarin Singapore Hotel Tower 1 in Singapore, designed by Stanley T. S. Leong.
October 16 – Azadi Tower, originally Shahyad Tower, Tehran, Iran, designed by Hossein Amanat

Buildings completed

 April – Hillbrow Tower in Johannesburg, South Africa.
 May – New Walker Art Center in Minneapolis, designed by Edward Larrabee Barnes.
 Marsham Towers, three 20-storey tower blocks for the Department of the Environment atop a 5-storey linking building at Marsham Street in Westminster, London, designed by Eric Bedford (demolished 2002–03).
 Mausoleum of Mohammed V, Rabat, Morocco.
 Maupoleum in Amsterdam, designed by Piet Zanstra (demolished 1994).
 Danmarks Nationalbank headquarters, Copenhagen, designed by Arne Jacobsen with Hans Dissing and Otto Weitling.
 Carmel de la Paix in Mazille, Saône-et-Loire, France, designed by Josep Lluís Sert.
 Fred. Olsen Lines terminal, London Docklands, the first major design of Foster Associates.
 Summerland Leisure Complex in Douglas, Isle of Man (destroyed by fire 1973).
 Ukrainian Institute of Scientific Research and Development, Kyiv, designed by L. Novikov and F. Yurijev.
 Redcar Library, England, designed by Ahrends, Burton and Koralek (demolished 2011).
 Villa Gontero, Cumiana, Italy, designed by Carlo Graffi.
 Anderton House, Rigg Side, Goodleigh, North Devon, England, designed by Peter Aldington and John Craig.
 Usdan Student Center, Brandeis University, designed by Hugh Stubbins

Awards
AIA Gold Medal – Louis Kahn
Architecture Firm Award – Albert Kahn Associates, Inc.
RAIA Gold Medal – Frederick Lucas
RIBA Royal Gold Medal – Hubert de Cronin Hastings
Twenty-five Year Award – Crow Island School

Births
May 7 – Marco Casagrande, Finnish architect, environmental artist, architectural theorist, writer and professor of architecture
May 17 – Martin Aunin, Estonian architect
Carlo Ratti, Italian-born architect and urban theorist
Rocio Romero, Chilean-born architect

Deaths

March 24 – Arne Jacobsen, Danish architect and designer (born 1902)
August 1 – Vincent Harris, English architect (born 1876)
August 28 – Edith Hughes, Britain's first professionally practising woman architect (born 1888)
October 16 – Robin Boyd, Australian architect (born 1919)
November 23 – Bertalan Árkay, Hungarian architect (born 1901)

References

 
20th-century architecture